There are about 141 genera of orchids representing about 1,100 orchid species, 900 of which are described as endemic to the Philippines. Many of them have showy, brightly colored and attractive flowers.
 
Vanda sanderiana is unofficially dubbed the National Flower, as the only representative of the species is unique to the Philippines and is only found on the island of Mindanao.

Abdominea

Abdominea minimiflora

Acampe
Acampe rigida

Acanthophippium
Acanthophippium mantinianum endemic to the Philippines
Acanthophippium sylhetense

Acriopsis
Acriopsis indica
Acriopsis liliiflolia

Aerides

A genus with species that have showy flowers, and in the Philippines, characterized by the presence of fleshy looking spurs.  The special feature of this flower is the fragrance some of the species of this genus has.
Aerides augustiana endemic to the Philippines
Aerides inflexa
Aerides lawrenceae endemic to the Philippines
Aerides leeana endemic to the Philippines
Aerides magnifica
Aerides migueldavidii
Aerides odorata
Aerides quinquevulnera
Aerides roebelenii
Aerides savageana endemic to the Philippines
Aerides shibatiana

Agrostophyllum

Agrostophyllum elmeri endemic to the Philippines
Agrostophyllum elongatum
Agrostophyllum inocephalum
Agrostophyllum leytense endemic to the Philippines
Agrostophyllum longivaginatum endemic to the Philippines
Agrostophyllum luzonense endemic to the Philippines
Agrostophyllum malindangense endemic to the Philippines
Agrostophyllum mearnsii
Agrostophyllum merrillii endemic to the Philippines
Agrostophyllum mindanaense endemic to the Philippines
Agrostophyllum philippinense endemic to the Philippines
Agrostophyllum planicaule
Agrostophyllum saccatilabium endemic to the Philippines
Agrostophyllum stipulatum
Agrostophyllum wenzelii

Amesiella
Amesiella minor endemic to the Philippines
Amesiella monticola endemic to the Philippines
Amesiella philippinensis endemic to the Philippines

Aphyllorchis
Aphyllorchis halconensis endemic to the Philippines
Aphyllorchis montana
Aphyllorchis pallida

Apostasia
Apostasia nuda
Apostasia wallichii

Appendicula
Appendicula alba
Appendicula anceps
Appendicula buxifolia
Appendicula clemensiae
Appendicula cornuta
Appendicula crotalina
Appendicula cuneata
Appendicula elmeri
Appendicula fenixii
Appendicula irigensis endemic to the Philippines
Appendicula laxifolia
Appendicula leytensis
Appendicula lucbanensis
Appendicula luzonsensis
Appendicula malindangensis
Appendicula maquilingensis endemic to the Philippines
Appendicula merrillii endemic to the Philippines
Appendicula negrosiana
Appendicula pendula
Appendicula perplexa
Appendicula polyantha
Appendicula reflexa
Appendicula tagalensium
Appendicula tembuyukenensis
Appendicula torta
Appendicula undulata
Appendicula weberi
Appendicula xytriophora

Arachnis

Arachnis breviscapa
Arachnis flos-aeris
Arachnis longicaulis

Arundina
Arundina graminifolia

Ascidieria
Ascidieria cymbidifolia
Ascidieria palawanensis
Ascidieria zamboangensis

Ascochilus
Ascochilus emarginatus
Ascochilus leytensis
Ascochilus mindanaensis
Ascochilus siamensis

Ascoglossum
Ascoglossum calopterum

Bogoria
Bogoria merrillii

Brachypeza
Brachypeza zamboangensis

Bromheadia
Bromheadia alticola
Bromheadia devogelii
Bromheadia finlaysoniana

Bulbophyllum
Bulbophyllum abbreviatum
Bulbophyllum absconditum
Bulbophyllum aeolium
Bulbophyllum aestivale
Bulbophyllum alagense
Bulbophyllum alboroseum
Bulbophyllum alsiosum
Bulbophyllum antenniferum
Bulbophyllum amplebracteatum
Bulbophyllum anascaputum
Bulbophyllum apertum
Bulbophyllum apodum
Bulbophyllum apoense
Bulbophyllum arrectum
Bulbophyllum auratum
Bulbophyllum basisetum
Bulbophyllum bataanense
Bulbophyllum baucoense
Bulbophyllum biflorum
Bulbophyllum bolsteri
Bulbophyllum bontocense
Bulbophyllum brevibrachiatum
Bulbophyllum brienianum
Bulbophyllum calophyllum
Bulbophyllum canlaonense
Bulbophyllum carunculatum
Bulbophyllum catenulatum
Bulbophyllum cephalophorum
Bulbophyllum cheiri
Bulbophyllum chrysendetum
Bulbophyllum chryseum
Bulbophyllum clandestinum
Bulbophyllum cleistogamum
Bulbophyllum clemensiae
Bulbophyllum colubrimodum
Bulbophyllum cootesii
Bulbophyllum cornutum
Bulbophyllum cryptophoranthus
Bulbophyllum cubicum
Bulbophyllum cumingii
Bulbophyllum cuneatum
Bulbophyllum cupreum
Bulbophyllum curranii
Bulbophyllum dasypetalum
Bulbophyllum dearei
Bulbophyllum debrincatiae
Bulbophyllum depressum
Bulbophyllum dissolutum
Bulbophyllum dolichoblepharon
Bulbophyllum doryphoroide
Bulbophyllum ebracteolatum
Bulbophyllum echinochilum
Bulbophyllum ecornutoides
Bulbophyllum elassoglossum
Bulbophyllum elmeri
Bulbophyllum elongatum
Bulbophyllum erosimarginatum
Bulbophyllum erosipetalum
Bulbophyllum erratum
Bulbophyllum escritorii
Bulbophyllum exile
Bulbophyllum exquisitum
Bulbophyllum facetum
Bulbophyllum fascinator
Bulbophyllum fenixii
Bulbophyllum flavescens
Bulbophyllum gerlandianum
Bulbophyllum gilvum
Bulbophyllum gimagaanense
Bulbophyllum glandulosum
Bulbophyllum glebodactylum
Bulbophyllum glebulosum
Bulbophyllum gnomoniferum
Bulbophyllum goebelianum
Bulbophyllum gusdorfii
Bulbophyllum halconense
Bulbophyllum inacootesiae
Bulbophyllum inunctum
Bulbophyllum invisum
Bulbophyllum kittredgei
Bulbophyllum lancifolium
Bulbophyllum lancilabium
Bulbophyllum lancipetalum
Bulbophyllum lasioglossum
Bulbophyllum lasiopetalum
Bulbophyllum laxiflorum
Bulbophyllum leibergii
Bulbophyllum lemniscatoides
Bulbophyllum lepantense
Bulbophyllum leptocaulon
Bulbophyllum levanae
Bulbophyllum leytense
Bulbophyllum lipense
Bulbophyllum lobbii
Bulbophyllum loherianum
Bulbophyllum longiflorum
Bulbophyllum longipetiolatum
Bulbophyllum macranthum
Bulbophyllum maculatum
Bulbophyllum makoyanum
Bulbophyllum maquilingense
Bulbophyllum marivelense
Bulbophyllum masaganapense
Bulbophyllum maxillare
Bulbophyllum mearnsii
Bulbophyllum membranifolium
Bulbophyllum merrittii
Bulbophyllum migueldavidii
Bulbophyllum mindorense
Bulbophyllum mona-lisae
Bulbophyllum monstrabile
Bulbophyllum mucronatum
Bulbophyllum mutabile
Bulbophyllum nasseri
Bulbophyllum negrosianum
Bulbophyllum nemorale
Bulbophyllum nymphopolitanum
Bulbophyllum ocellatum
Bulbophyllum odoratum
Bulbophyllum orectopetalum
Bulbophyllum orthoglossum
Bulbophyllum othonis
Bulbophyllum pampangense
Bulbophyllum papillipetalum
Bulbophyllum papulosum
Bulbophyllum pardalotum
Bulbophyllum pauciflorum
Bulbophyllum penduliscapum
Bulbophyllum peramoenum
Bulbophyllum piestoglossum
Bulbophyllum pleurothalloides
Bulbophyllum plumatum
Bulbophyllum pseudoconiferum
Bulbophyllum puguahaanense
Bulbophyllum putidum
Bulbophyllum ravanii
Bulbophyllum recurvilabre
Bulbophyllum rhizomatosum
Bulbophyllum romyi
Bulbophyllum rugosum
Bulbophyllum rysyanum
Bulbophyllum santosii
Bulbophyllum sapphirinum
Bulbophyllum saurocephalum
Bulbophyllum savaiense
sbsp. subcubicum
Bulbophyllum schefferi
Bulbophyllum sempiternum
Bulbophyllum sensile
Bulbophyllum serratotruncatum
Bulbophyllum sibuyanense
Bulbophyllum simulacrum
Bulbophyllum socordine
Bulbophyllum stellatum
Bulbophyllum subaequale
Bulbophyllum superfluum
Bulbophyllum surigaense
Bulbophyllum tenuifolium
Bulbophyllum toppingii
Bulbophyllum tortuosum
Bulbophyllum trigonosepalum
Bulbophyllum umbellatum
Bulbophyllum unguiculatum
Bulbophyllum uniflorum
Bulbophyllum vagans
Bulbophyllum vaginatum
Bulbophyllum vermiculare
Bulbophyllum vespertilio
Bulbophyllum weberi
Bulbophyllum whitfordii
Bulbophyllum williamsii
Bulbophyllum woelfliae
Bulbophyllum zambalense
Bulbophyllum zamboangense

Calanthe
Calanthe alba
Calanthe angustifolia
Calanthe conspicua
Calanthe davaensis
Calanthe halconensis
Calanthe hennisii
Calanthe jusnerii
Calanthe lacerata
Calanthe lyroglossa
Calanthe maquilingensis
Calanthe mcgregorii
Calanthe mindorensis
Calanthe nivalis
Calanthe pulchra
Calanthe rosea
Calanthe rubens
Calanthe speciosa
Calanthe triplicata
Calanthe vestita

Cephalantheropsis
Cephalantheropsis halconensis
Cephalantheropsis longipes
Cephalantheropsis obcordata

Ceratocentron
Ceratocentron fesseli endemic to the Philippines

Ceratostylis
Ceratostylis caespitosa
Ceratostylis dataensis
Ceratostylis elmeri
Ceratostylis heterophylla
Ceratostylis incognita
Ceratostylis loheri
Ceratostylis mindanaensis
Ceratostylis philippinensis
Ceratostylis ramosa
Ceratostylis retisquama
Ceratostylis senilis
Ceratostylis subulata
Ceratostylis wenzelii

Chamaeanthus
Chamaeanthus brachystachys
Chamaeanthus wenzelii

Cheirostylis
Cheirostylis chinensis
Cheirostylis merrillii
Cheirostylis octodactyla

Chelonistele
Chelonistele sulphurea

Chrysoglossum
Chrysoglossum ornatum

Claderia
Claderia papuana

Cleisostoma
Cleisostoma chrysochilum
Cleisostoma duplicilobum
Cleisostoma sagittatum
Cleisostoma striolatum
Cleisostoma subulatum
Cleisostoma uraiense
Cleisostoma williamsonii

Coelogyne
Coelogyne alvinlokii endemic to the Philippines
Coelogyne asperata
Coelogyne bilamellata endemic to the Philippines
Coelogyne candoonensis
Coelogyne chloroptera endemic to the Philippines
Coelogyne confusa endemic to the Philippines
Coelogyne elmeri
Coelogyne integerrima
Coelogyne loheri
Coelogyne longirachis
Coelogyne marmorata endemic to the Philippines
Coelogyne mayeriana
Coelogyne merrillii endemic to the Philippines
Coelogyne minutissima
Coelogyne palawanensis
Coelogyne pandurata
Coelogyne prasina
Coelogyne quinquelamellata endemic to the Philippines
Coelogyne remediosae endemic to the Philippines
Coelogyne rochussenii
Coelogyne rubrolanata
Coelogyne salvaneraniana endemic to the Philippines
Coelogyne sparsa endemic to the Philippines
Coelogyne sulcata
Coelogyne swaniana
Coelogyne usitana endemic to the Philippines
Coelogyne vanoverberghii endemic to the Philippines
Coelogyne zahlbrucknerae

Collabium
Collabium formosanum
Collabium simplex

Cordiglottis
Cordiglottis filiformis

Corybas
Corybas merrillii
Corybas laceratus
Corybas ramosianus

Corymborkis
Corymborkis veratrifolia

Crepidium
Crepidium acuminatum
Crepidium alagense
Crepidium arietinum
Crepidium atrosanguineum
Crepidium balabacense
Crepidium bancanoides
Crepidium bataanense
Crepidium binabayense
Crepidium bracteosum
Crepidium carinatum
Crepidium copelandii
Crepidium cuneipetalum
Crepidium davaensis
Crepidium dentatum
Crepidium elmeri
Crepidium epidendrum
Crepidium hutchinsonianum
Crepidium lilacinum
Crepidium merrillii
Crepidium mindorense
Crepidium negrosianum
Crepidium propinquum
Crepidium purpureiflorum
Crepidium purpureum
Crepidium quadridentatum
Crepidium quadrilobium
Crepidium ramosii
Crepidium taylorii
Crepidium tjiwideiense
Crepidium uncatum
Crepidium wenzelii
Crepidium williamsii

Cryptostylis
Cryptostylis acutata
Cryptostylis arachnites
Cryptostylis taiwaniana

Cymbidium
Cymbidium aliciae (Philippines)
Cymbidium aloifolium
Cymbidium atropurpureum
Cymbidium bicolor
subsp. pubescens
Cymbidium chloranthum
Cymbidium cyperifolium 
Cymbidium dayanum
Cymbidium ensifolium
Cymbidium finlaysonianum
Cymbidium lancifolium

Cyrtosia
Cyrtosia javanica

Cystorchis
Cystorchis aphylla
Cystorchis javanica
Cystorchis luzonensis

Dendrobium

Dendrobium aclinia 
Dendrobium acuminatissimum 
Dendrobium acutilingue 
Dendrobium agusanense 
Dendrobium albayense 
Dendrobium aliciae 
Dendrobium aloifolium 
Dendrobium amethystoglossum endemic to the Philippines
Dendrobium anosmum 
Dendrobium aphyllum 
Dendrobium appendiculatum 
Dendrobium auriculatum endemic to the Philippines
Dendrobium balzerianum endemic to the Philippines
Dendrobium bancanum 
Dendrobium basilanense 
Dendrobium bicaudatum 
Dendrobium bicolense 
Dendrobium blanche-amesiae 
Dendrobium blumei 
Dendrobium boosii 
Dendrobium bukidnonense 
Dendrobium bullenianum 
Dendrobium bunuanense 
Dendrobium busuangense endemic to the Philippines
Dendrobium cabadbarense 
Dendrobium candoonense 
Dendrobium carinatum endemic to the Philippines
Dendrobium ceraula endemic to the Philippines
Dendrobium chameleon 
Dendrobium chloranthum 
Dendrobium chrysographatum 
Dendrobium clemensiae 
Dendrobium comatum 
Dendrobium compactum 
Dendrobium compressum 
Dendrobium conanthum 
Dendrobium convexum 
Dendrobium crassimarginatum 
Dendrobium crumenatum 
Dendrobium davaoense 
Dendrobium dearei 
Dendrobium decoratum 
Dendrobium derekcabactulanii 
Dendrobium diffusum 
Dendrobium distichum endemic to the Philippines
Dendrobium equitans 
Dendrobium erosum 
Dendrobium escritorii 
Dendrobium eurorum 
Dendrobium fairchildiae endemic to the Philippines
Dendrobium gerlandianum endemic to the Philippines
Dendrobium goldschmidtianum 
Dendrobium guerreroi endemic to the Philippines
Dendrobium hercoglossum 
Dendrobium heterocarpum 
Dendrobium hymenanthum 
Dendrobium indivisum 
Dendrobium interjectum 
Dendrobium ionopus 
Dendrobium josephinae 
Dendrobium junceum endemic to the Philippines
Dendrobium junctilobum 
Dendrobium leytense 
Dendrobium lobbii 
Dendrobium loherianum 
Dendrobium lunatum 
Dendrobium luxurians 
Dendrobium luzonense 
Dendrobium macrophyllum 
Dendrobium marivelense 
Dendrobium merrillii endemic to the Philippines
Dendrobium metachilinum 
Dendrobium microphyton 
Dendrobium milaniae endemic to the Philippines
Dendrobium mindanaense endemic to the Philippines
Dendrobium miyasakii 
Dendrobium modestum 
Dendrobium multiramosum 
Dendrobium nebularum 
Dendrobium nemorale endemic to the Philippines
Dendrobium niveobarbatum endemic to the Philippines
Dendrobium obrienianum 
Dendrobium omissum 
Dendrobium orbilobulatum endemic to the Philippines
Dendrobium ornithoflorum 
Dendrobium pachyphyllum 
Dendrobium papilio endemic to the Philippines
Dendrobium parciflorum
Dendrobium parietiforme 
Dendrobium parthenium 
Dendrobium pentapterum 
Dendrobium pergracile 
Dendrobium philippinense endemic to the Philippines

Dendrobium phillipsii endemic to the Philippines
Dendrobium planibulbe 
Dendrobium planum 
Dendrobium plicatile 
Dendrobium polytrichum endemic to the Philippines
Dendrobium profusum endemic to the Philippines
Dendrobium pseudoconvexum 
Dendrobium pseudoequitans 
Dendrobium pterocarpum 
Dendrobium purpureostelidium 
Dendrobium quisumbingii 
Dendrobium ramosii endemic to the Philippines
Dendrobium ravanii 
Dendrobium reypimentelii 
Dendrobium rhodochilum 
Dendrobium rhombeum endemic to the Philippines
Dendrobium sanderae endemic to the Philippines
Dendrobium sanguinolentum 
Dendrobium schettleri 
Dendrobium schuetzei endemic to the Philippines
Dendrobium scopa 
Dendrobium secundum 
Dendrobium serratilabium endemic to the Philippines
Dendrobium sibuyanense 
Dendrobium sinuosum 
Dendrobium spurium 
Dendrobium stella-silvae 
Dendrobium stricticalcarum 
Dendrobium stuposum 
Dendrobium taurinum endemic to the Philippines
Dendrobium tetrachromum 
Dendrobium thysanophorum
Dendrobium tiongii 
Dendrobium treacherianum 
Dendrobium unicorne 
Dendrobium uniflorum 
Dendrobium × usitae endemic to the Philippines
Dendrobium usterii 
Dendrobium usterioides 
Dendrobium velutinelabrum 
Dendrobium ventricosum 
Dendrobium victoriae-reginae endemic to the Philippines
Dendrobium wenzelii endemic to the Philippines
Dendrobium yeageri endemic to the Philippines
Dendrobium zamboangense

Dendrochilum
Dendrochilum abortum 
Dendrochilum affine 
Dendrochilum amesianum 
Dendrochilum anfractum 
var. anfractoides
Dendrochilum apiculatum 
Dendrochilum apoense 
Dendrochilum arachnites 
Dendrochilum asperum 
Dendrochilum auriculare 
Dendrochilum banksii 
Dendrochilum binuangense 
Dendrochilum cinnabarinum 
var. sanguineum
Dendrochilum cobbianum 
Dendrochilum coccineum 
Dendrochilum convallariiforme 
var. minor
Dendrochilum cootesii 
Dendrochilum copelandii 
Dendrochilum cordatum 
Dendrochilum croceum 
Dendrochilum curranii 
var. serratoi
Dendrochilum cymbiforme 
Dendrochilum ecallosum 
Dendrochilum edanoi 
Dendrochilum elmeri 
Dendrochilum exiguum 
Dendrochilum exile 
Dendrochilum eximium 
Dendrochilum filiforme 
Dendrochilum flexuosum 
Dendrochilum foxworthyi 
Dendrochilum geigeri 
Dendrochilum glumaceum 
Dendrochilum graciliscapum 
Dendrochilum graminifolium 
Dendrochilum hampelii 
Dendrochilum hastatum 
Dendrochilum hutchinsonianum 
Dendrochilum irigense 
Dendrochilum javierense 
Dendrochilum kingii 
Dendrochilum kopfii 
Dendrochilum latifolium 
var. macranthum
Dendrochilum loheri 
Dendrochilum longibulbum 
Dendrochilum longifolium 
Dendrochilum longilabre 
Dendrochilum louisianum 
Dendrochilum luzonense 
Dendrochilum macgregorii 
Dendrochilum magnum 
Dendrochilum maleolens 
Dendrochilum malindangense 
Dendrochilum marginatum 
Dendrochilum mearnsii 
Dendrochilum merrillii 
Dendrochilum microchilum 
Dendrochilum migueldavidii 
Dendrochilum mindanaense 
Dendrochilum mindorense 
Dendrochilum niveum 
Dendrochilum ocellatum 
Dendrochilum oliganthum 
Dendrochilum oreophilum 
Dendrochilum pallidiflavens 
Dendrochilum pangasinanense 
Dendrochilum parvipapillatum 
Dendrochilum parvulum 
var. strictiforme
Dendrochilum perplexum 
var. montanum
Dendrochilum philippinense 
 var. purpureum
Dendrochilum plocoglottoides 
Dendrochilum prodigiosum 
Dendrochilum propinquum 
Dendrochilum pseudowenzelii 
Dendrochilum pulcherrimum 
Dendrochilum pulogense 
Dendrochilum pumilum 
var. recurvum
Dendrochilum quadrilobum 
Dendrochilum quinquecallosum 
Dendrochilum quisumbingianum 
Dendrochilum ravanii 
Dendrochilum reniforme 
Dendrochilum rhombophorum 
Dendrochilum rotundilabium 
Dendrochilum saccolabium 
Dendrochilum schweinfurthianum 
Dendrochilum septemnervium 
Dendrochilum simulacrum 
Dendrochilum smithianum 
Dendrochilum stenophyllum 
Dendrochilum tenellum 
Dendrochilum tenuibulbum 
Dendrochilum tenuifolium 
Dendrochilum tetradactyliferum 
Dendrochilum tiongianum 
Dendrochilum tortile 
Dendrochilum turpe 
Dendrochilum uncatum 
var. longispicatum
Dendrochilum undulatum 
Dendrochilum unicallosum 
Dendrochilum unicorne 
Dendrochilum vanoverberghii 
Dendrochilum warrenii 
Dendrochilum wenzelii 
Dendrochilum williamsii 
Dendrochilum woodianum 
Dendrochilum yuccifolium

Dendrolirium
Dendrolirium ornatum

Didymoplexis
Didymoplexis micradenia
Didymoplexis pallens
Didymoplexis philippinensis

Dienia
Dienia carinata 
Dienia ophrydis

Diglyphosa
Diglyphosa elmeri 
Diglyphosa latifolia

Dilochia
Dilochia elmeri 
Dilochia wallichii

Dipodium
Dipodium fevrellii 
Dipodium paludosum 
Dipodium pictum 
Dipodium scandens

Disperis
Disperis neilgherrensis

Epiblastus
Epiblastus merrillii

Epipogium
Epipogium roseum

Eria
Eria albolutea 
Eria aliciae 
Eria aporoides 
Eria binabayensis 
Eria brachystachya 
Eria cootesii 
Eria cymbiformis 
Eria elisheae 
Eria fastigiatifolia 
Eria halconensis 
Eria javanica 
Eria longissima 
Eria mearnsii 
Eria odorifera 
Eria ornata 
Eria perspicabilis 
Eria propinqua 
Eria ramosii 
Eria robusta 
Eria sessilifolia

Erythrodes
Erythrodes boettcheri 
Erythrodes weberi 
Erythrodes wenzelii 
Erythrorchis altissima

Euanthe
Vanda sanderiana endemic to the Philippines

Eulophia
Eulophia bicallosa 
Eulophia dentata
Eulophia exaltata 
Eulophia graminea 
Eulophia pulchra 
Eulophia spectabilis 
Eulophia stricta
Eulophia zollingeri

Galeola
Galeola nudifolia

Gastrochilus
Gastrochilus calceolaris 
Gastrochilus sororius

Gastrodia
Gastrodia javanica 
Gastrodia verrucosa

Geodorum
Geodorum densiflorum 
Geodorum terrestre

Glomera
Glomera gastrodioides
Glomera merrillii

Goodyera
Goodyera clausa 
Goodyera elmeri 
Goodyera fumata 
Goodyera luzonensis 
Goodyera procera 
Goodyera ramosii 
Goodyera rubicunda 
Goodyera viridiflora

Grammatophyllum
Grammatophyllum elegans 
Grammatophyllum martae endemic to the Philippines
Grammatophyllum measuresianum endemic to the Philippines
Grammatophyllum multiflorum endemic to the Philippines
fma. tigrinum
Grammatophyllum ravanii 
Grammatophyllum rumphianum 
Grammatophyllum scriptum 
Grammatophyllum speciosum 
Grammatophyllum stapeliiflorum 
Grammatophyllum wallisii

Grosourdya
Grosourdya appendiculata 
Grosourdya muscosa 
Grosourdya tripercus

Habenaria
Habenaria alagensis 
Habenaria aristulifera 
Habenaria boadanensis 
Habenaria congesta 
Habenaria curranii 
Habenaria dentata 
Habenaria diphylla 
Habenaria falcigera 
Habenaria leibergii 
Habenaria lingulosa 
Habenaria malintana 
Habenaria mearnsii 
Habenaria muricata 
Habenaria polytricha 
Habenaria ponerostachys 
Habenaria reticulata 
Habenaria rhodocheila 
subsp. philippinensis
Habenaria robinsonii 
Habenaria rosulata 
Habenaria rumphii 
Habenaria stenopetala 
Habenaria vanoverberghii 
Habenaria warburgana 
Habenaria zephyrica

Herminium
Herminium lanceum

Hetaeria
Hetaeria anomala 
Hetaeria elata 
Hetaeria oblongifolia

Hippeophyllum
Hippeophyllum wenzelii

Hylophila
Hylophila lanceolata 
Hylophila rubra

Hymenorchis
Hymenorchis vanoverberghii

Kuhlhasseltia
Kuhlhasseltia whiteheadii 
Kuhlhasseltia yakushimensis

Lecanorchis
Lecanorchis javanica

Lepidogyne
Lepidogyne longifolia

Liparis
Liparis acaulis 
Liparis amesiana 
Liparis asinacephala 
Liparis barbata 
Liparis benguetensis 
Liparis bicuspidata 
Liparis bontocensis 
Liparis bootanensis 
Liparis carnicolor 
Liparis cauliflora 
Liparis cespitosa 
Liparis condylobulbon 
Liparis cumingii 
Liparis distans 
Liparis dumaguetensis 
Liparis elegans 
Liparis elliptica 
Liparis elmeri 
Liparis fragilis 
Liparis grossa 
Liparis halconensis 
Liparis latifolia 
Liparis leytensis 
Liparis linearifolia 
Liparis magnicallosa 
Liparis merrillii 
Liparis negrosiana 
Liparis nervosa 
Liparis nutans 
Liparis palawanensis 
Liparis pallida 
Liparis parviflora 
Liparis philippinensis 
Liparis prava 
Liparis propinqua 
Liparis somae 
Liparis tricallosa 
Liparis trichoglottis 
Liparis viridicallus 
Liparis viridiflora

Ludisia
Ludisia discolor
Ludisia ravanii

Luisia
Luisia cordatilabia 
Luisia curtisii 
Luisia foxworthii 
Luisia ramosii 
Luisia tristis

Macodes
Macodes petola

Macropodanthus
Macropodanthus cootesii endemic to the Philippines
Macropodanthus philippinense endemic to the Philippines

Malaxis
Malaxis bulusanensis 
Malaxis longipedunculata 
Malaxis monophyllos

Megalotus
Megalotus bifidus

Micropera
Micropera edanoi 
Micropera loheri 
Micropera philippinensis 
Micropera utriculosa

Microsaccus
Microsaccus griffithii 
Microsaccus wenzelii

Microtatorchis
Microtatorchis aristata 
Microtatorchis compacta

Microtis
Microtis unifolia

Mycaranthes
Mycaranthes anceps 
Mycaranthes candoonensis 
Mycaranthes citrina 
Mycaranthes clemensiae 
Mycaranthes davaensis 
Mycaranthes gigantea 
Mycaranthes lamellata 
Mycaranthes leonardoi 
Mycaranthes longibracteata 
Mycaranthes major 
Mycaranthes mindanaensis 
Mycaranthes oblitterata 
Mycaranthes vanoverberghii

Myrmechis
Myrmechis gracilis 
Myrmechis perpusilla 
Myrmechis philippinensiis

Nephelaphyllum
Nephelaphyllum mindorense 
Nephelaphyllum pulchrum

Nervilia
Nervilia concolor 
Nervilia crociformis 
Nervilia dilatata 
Nervilia plicata

Neuwiedia
Neuwiedia veratrifolia

Oberonia
Oberonia aporophylla 
Oberonia basilanensis 
Oberonia benguetensis 
Oberonia cylindrica 
Oberonia elmeri 
Oberonia hispidula 
Oberonia leytensis 
Oberonia lipensis 
Oberonia luzonensis 
Oberonia lycopodioides 
Oberonia mcgregorii 
Oberonia merrillii 
Oberonia mindorensis 
Oberonia minima 
Oberonia minutissima 
Oberonia monstruosa 
Oberonia mucronata 
Oberonia obesa 
Oberonia reilloi 
Oberonia rufilabris 
Oberonia setigera endemic to the Philippines
Oberonia surigaensis 
Oberonia thisbe 
Oberonia toppingii 
Oberonia wenzelii

Octarrhena
Octarrhena amesiana 
Octarrhena elmeri 
Octarrhena ensifolia 
Octarrhena gemmifera 
Octarrhena parvula

Omoea
Omoea philippinensis endemic to the Philippines

Orchipedum
Orchipedum wenzelii

Oxystophyllum
Oxystophyllum carnosum 
Oxystophyllum cultratum 
Oxystophyllum elmeri

Pachystoma
Pachystoma pubescens

Paphiopedilum

Paphiopedilum acmodontum 
Paphiopedilum adductum 
Paphiopedilum argus endemic to the Philippines
Paphiopedilum barbatum 
Paphiopedilum ciliolare 
Paphiopedilum x expansum 
Paphiopedilum fowliei endemic to the Philippines
Paphiopedilum haynaldianum endemic to the Philippines
Paphiopedilum hennisianum endemic to the Philippines
Paphiopedilum parnatanum endemic to the Philippines
Paphiopedilum philippinense endemic to the Philippines
var. roebelenii
Paphiopedilum randsii endemic to the Philippines
Paphiopedilum superbiens 
Paphiopedilum urbanianum endemic to the Philippines

Parapteroceras
Parapteroceras escritorii 
Parapteroceras quisumbingii

Pennilabium
Pennilabium confusum 
Pennilabium luzonense

Peristylus
Peristylus constrictus 
Peristylus copelandii 
Peristylus goodyeroides 
Peristylus gracilis 
Peristylus grandis 
Peristylus intrudens 
Peristylus lacertifer 
Peristylus monticola

Phaius

Phaius amboinensis 
Phaius antoninae 
Phaius borneensis 
Phaius callosus 
Phaius flavus 
Phaius fragilis 
Phaius lyonii 
Phaius mishmensis 
Phaius philippinensis 
Phaius tankervilleae

Phalaenopsis
Found in Himalayan mountains, Southern India and rest of Southeast Asia, the most number of species for this genus of orchids are found in the Philippines. The country represents the center of Phalaenopsis orchids with about twenty two species and several natural hybrids, more than any other country in the world. Some of the species endemic to the Philippines such as P. stuartiana, P. sanderiana and P. schilleriana, have had the greatest influence on hybridizing than any other Phalaenopsis species.

Phalaenopsis amabilis 
Phalaenopsis × amphitrite 
Phalaenopsis aphrodite 
Phalaenopsis bastianii endemic to the Philippines
Phalaenopsis cornu-cervi 
Phalaenopsis deliciosa 
Phalaenopsis equestris 
Phalaenopsis fasciata endemic to the Philippines
Phalaenopsis fuscata 
Phalaenopsis hieroglyphica endemic to the Philippines
Phalaenopsis × intermedia endemic to the Philippines
Phalaenopsis × leucorrhoda 
Phalaenopsis lindenii endemic to the Philippines
Phalaenopsis lueddemanniana endemic to the Philippines
Phalaenopsis mariae 
Phalaenopsis micholitzii endemic to the Philippines
Phalaenopsis pallens endemic to the Philippines
Phalaenopsis philippinensis endemic to the Philippines
Phalaenopsis pulchra endemic to the Philippines
Phalaenopsis reichenbachiana endemic to the Philippines
Phalaenopsis sanderiana endemic to the Philippines
Phalaenopsis schilleriana endemic to the Philippines
Phalaenopsis stuartiana endemic to the Philippines
Phalaenopsis sumatrana 
Phalaenopsis × veitchiana
Phalaenopsis venosa

Pholidota
Pholidota articulata 
Pholidota carnea 
Pholidota imbricata 
Pholidota ventricosa

Phragmorchis
Phragmorchis teretifolia

Phreatia
Phreatia amesii 
Phreatia aristulifera 
Phreatia caulescens 
Phreatia densiflora 
Phreatia infundibuliformis 
Phreatia listrophora 
Phreatia luzoniensis 
Phreatia mearnsii 
Phreatia negrosiana 
Phreatia plantaginifolia 
Phreatia ramosii 
Phreatia sulcata 
Phreatia tahitensis 
Phreatia vanoverberghii 
Phreatia wenzelii 
Phreatia xantholeuca

Pilophyllum
Pilophyllum villosum

Pinalia
Pinalia barbifrons 
Pinalia bractescens 
Pinalia carnicolor 
Pinalia compacta 
Pinalia copelandii 
Pinalia copelandii 
Pinalia curranii 
Pinalia cylindrostachya 
Pinalia dagamensis 
Pinalia densa 
Pinalia floribunda 
Pinalia graciliscapa 
Pinalia hutchinsoniana 
Pinalia jarensis 
Pinalia leavittii 
Pinalia longicruris 
Pinalia longilabris 
Pinalia lyonii 
Pinalia macera 
Pinalia maquilingensis 
Pinalia merrittii 
Pinalia microchila 
Pinalia nielsenii 
Pinalia ovata 
Pinalia philippinensis 
Pinalia polyura endemic to the Philippines
Pinalia profusa 
Pinalia puguahaanensis 
Pinalia ramosa 
Pinalia rhodoptera 
Pinalia ringens 
Pinalia senilis 
Pinalia taylorii 
Pinalia tridens 
Pinalia ventricosa 
Pinalia woodiana 
Pinalia xanthocheila

Platanthera
Platanthera angustata
Platanthera singgalangensis

Plocoglottis
Plocoglottis bicallosa 
Plocoglottis bicomata 
Plocoglottis copelandii 
Plocoglottis javanica
Plocoglottis loheriana 
Plocoglottis lucbanensis 
Plocoglottis mindorensis 
Plocoglottis plicata

Poaephyllum
Poaephyllum grandiflorum 
Poaephyllum pauciflorum

Podochilus
Podochilus bicaudatus 
Podochilus cumingii 
Podochilus hystricinus 
Podochilus intricatus 
Podochilus longilabris 
Podochilus lucescens 
Podochilus plumosus 
Podochilus ramosii 
Podochilus sciuroides 
Podochilus strictus

Polystachya
Polystachya concreta

Pomatocalpa
Pomatocalpa bicolor 
Pomatocalpa diffusum 
Pomatocalpa fuscum 
Pomatocalpa kunstleri 
Pomatocalpa maculosum 
subsp. andamanicum
Pomatocalpa spicatum

Porphyrodesme
Porphyrodesme papuana 
Porphyrodesme sarcanthoides

Pseuderia
Pseuderia samarana endemic to the Philippines

Pseudovanilla
Pseudovanilla philippinensis

Pteroceras
Pteroceras cladostachyum 
Pteroceras leopardinum 
Pteroceras longicalcareum 
Pteroceras pallidum 
Pteroceras philippinense 
Pteroceras teres 
Pteroceras unguiculatum

Renanthera
Renanthera breviflora
Renanthera elongata
Renanthera matutina
Renanthera monachica endemic to the Philippines
Renanthera philippinensis endemic to the Philippines
Renanthera storiei endemic to the Philippines

Rhomboda
Rhomboda blackii 
Rhomboda cristata 
Rhomboda lanceolata

Rhynchostylis
Rhynchostylis gigantea
subsp. violacea
Rhynchostylis retusa
Rhynchostylis rieferi

Robiquetia
Robiquetia ascendens
Robiquetia aberrans 
Robiquetia baliensis 
Robiquetia cerina 
Robiquetia compressa 
Robiquetia constricta 
Robiquetia discolor 
Robiquetia enigma 
Robiquetia pantherina 
Robiquetia spathulata 
Robiquetia vanoverberghii
Robiquetia eburnea 
Robiquetia flammea 
Robiquetia lyonii
Robiquetiaa schizogenia

Saccolabiopsis
Saccolabiopsis tenella 
Saccolabiopsis viridiflora

Samarorchis
Samarorchis sulitiana

Santotomasia
Santotomasia wardiana

Sarcophyton
Sarcophyton crassifolium 
Sarcophyton pachyphyllum

Schoenorchis
Schoenorchis micrantha 
Schoenorchis paniculata 
Schoenorchis vanoverberghii

Schuitemania
Schuitemania merrillii

Spathoglottis
Spathoglottis chrysantha 
Spathoglottis elmeri 
Spathoglottis kimballiana 
Spathoglottis palawanensis 
Spathoglottis x parsonsii 
Spathoglottis philippinensis 
Spathoglottis plicata 
Spathoglottis tomentosa 
Spathoglottis vanoverberghii

Spiranthes
Spiranthes sinensis

Staurochilus
Moved to trichoglottis

Stereochilus
Stereochilus ringens

Stereosandra
Stereosandra javanica

Stichorkis
Stichorkis compressa 
Stichorkis disticha 
Stichorkis gibbosa

Taeniophyllum
Taeniophyllum biocellatum 
Taeniophyllum copelandii 
Taeniophyllum elmeri 
Taeniophyllum leytense 
Taeniophyllum merrillii 
Taeniophyllum philippinense 
Taeniophyllum saccatum

Tainia
Tainia elmeri endemic to the Philippines
Tainia maingayi

Thecostele
Thecostele alata

Thelasis
Thelasis capitata 
Thelasis carinata 
Thelasis micrantha 
Thelasis obtusa 
Thelasis pygmaea

Thelymitra
Thelymitra javanica

Thrixspermum
Thrixspermum acuminatissimum 
Thrixspermum agusanense 
Thrixspermum amesianum 
Thrixspermum amplexicaule 
Thrixspermum angustatum 
Thrixspermum bromeliforme 
Thrixspermum celebicum 
Thrixspermum centipeda 
Thrixspermum cootesii 
Thrixspermum elmeri 
Thrixspermum elongatum 
Thrixspermum eximium 
Thrixspermum fantasticum 
Thrixspermum fernandeziae 
Thrixspermum hystrix 
Thrixspermum integrum 
Thrixspermum ligulatum 
Thrixspermum linearifolium 
Thrixspermum merguense 
Thrixspermum pensile 
Thrixspermum quinquelobum 
Thrixspermum robinsonii 
Thrixspermum rostratum 
Thrixspermum subulatum 
Thrixspermum vanoverberghii 
Thrixspermum weberi 
Thrixspermum wenzelii

Trichoglottis

Trichoglottis amesiana 
Trichoglottis apoensis 
Trichoglottis atropurpurea endemic to the Philippines
Trichoglottis brachystachya 
Trichoglottis calochila 
Trichoglottis geminata 
Trichoglottis latisepala 
Trichoglottis mindanaensis 
Trichoglottis philippinensis
Trichoglottis rosea 
Trichoglottis solerederi
Trichoglottis subviolacea

Staurochilus agusanensis 
Staurochilus corazoniae 
Staurochilus fasciatus 
Staurochilus guibertii 
Staurochilus intermedius 
Staurochilus ionosmus 
Staurochilus leytensis 
Staurochilus loherianus 
Staurochilus luchuensis 
Staurochilus luzonensis 
Staurochilus mimicus 
Staurochilus tamesii

Trichotosia
Trichotosia fusca 
Trichotosia hirsutipetala 
Trichotosia lagunensis 
Trichotosia leytensis 
Trichotosia mcgregorii 
Trichotosia ramosii
Trichotosia vulpina

Tropidia
Tropidia angulosa 
Tropidia mindanaensis 
Tropidia mindorensis 
Tropidia nipponica 
Tropidia pedunculata
Tropidia robinsonii 
Tropidia schlechteriana 
Tropidia septemnervis 
Tropidia somae

Tuberolabium
Tuberolabium brevirhachis 
Tuberolabium guamense 
Tuberolabium kotoense 
Tuberolabium minutum 
Tuberolabium phillipsii 
Tuberolabium rhopalorrhachis 
Tuberolabium sarcochiloides 
Tuberolabium woodii

Vanda
Vanda aurantiacum 
subsp. philippinense
Vanda barnesii 
Vanda cootesii 
Vanda furva 
Vanda helvola 
Vanda javierae (Philippines - Luzon).
Vanda lamellata 
var. boxallii 
Vanda limbata 
Vanda luzonica (Philippines - Luzon).
Vanda mariae
Vanda merrillii (Philippines).
Vanda miniatum
Vanda mindanaoensis 
Vanda roeblingiana (Philippines - Luzon).
Vanda scandens
Vanda tricolor
Vanda ustii (Philippines - Luzon).

Vandopsis
Vandopsis lissochiloides

Vanilla
Vanilla calopogon 
Vanilla ovalis 
Vanilla platyphylla
Vanilla raabii
Vanilla deceasarii
Vanilla philippinensis

Vrydagzynea
Vrydagzynea albida 
Vrydagzynea vrydagzynoides 
Vrydagzynea weberi

Zeuxine
Zeuxine elmeri 
Zeuxine flava 
Zeuxine lancifolia 
Zeuxine leytensis 
Zeuxine marivelensis 
Zeuxine mindanaensis 
Zeuxine nervosa 
Zeuxine parvifolia 
Zeuxine philippinensis 
Zeuxine strateumatica 
Zeuxine weberi 
Zeuxine wenzelii

References 

Philippines